Berkeley Heights is a township in Union County, in the U.S. state of New Jersey. A commuter town in northern-central New Jersey, the township is nestled within the Raritan Valley region in the New York metropolitan area. As of the 2020 United States census, the township's population was 13,285, an increase of 102 (+.8%) from the 2010 census count of 13,183, which in turn reflected a decline of 224 (−1.7%) from the 13,407 counted in the 2000 census.

Berkeley Heights was originally incorporated as New Providence Township by the New Jersey Legislature on November 8, 1809, from portions of Springfield Township, while the area was still part of Essex County. New Providence Township became part of the newly formed Union County at its creation on March 19, 1857. Portions of the township were taken on March 23, 1869, to create Summit, and on March 14, 1899, to form the borough of New Providence. On November 6, 1951, the name of the township was changed to Berkeley Heights, based on the results of a referendum held that day. The township was named for John Berkeley, 1st Baron Berkeley of Stratton, one of the founders of the Province of New Jersey.

The township has been ranked as one of the state's highest-income communities. Based on data from the American Community Survey for 2013–2017, township residents had a median household income of $147,614, ranked 15th in the state among municipalities with more than 10,000 residents, almost double the statewide median of $76,475.

In Money magazine's 2013 Best Places to Live rankings, Berkeley Heights was ranked 6th in the nation, the highest among the three places in New Jersey included in the top 50 list. The magazine's 2007 list had the township ranked 45th out of a potential 2,800 places in the United States with populations above 7,500 and under 50,000.

In its 2010 rankings of the "Best Places to Live", New Jersey Monthly magazine ranked Berkeley Heights as the 19th best place to live in New Jersey.<ref>[http://njmonthly.com/articles/towns_and_schools/best-places-to-live-2010.html "Best Places To Live 2010], New Jersey Monthly, February 11, 2010. Accessed July 3, 2011.</ref> In its 2008 rankings of the "Best Places To Live" New Jersey Monthly magazine ranked Berkeley Heights as the 59th best place to live in New Jersey.

The township was listed as the fifth safest place in New Jersey as well as the ninth safest municipality in the nation according to a 2022 crime statistic compilation from Safewise.com.

History
The Lenape Native Americans were known to inhabit the region, including the area now known as Berkeley Heights, dating back to the 1524 voyage of Giovanni da Verrazzano to what is now the lower New York Bay.

The earliest construction in Berkeley Heights began in an area that is now part of the  Watchung Reservation, a Union County park that includes  of the township.

The first European settler was Peter Willcox, who received a  land grant in 1720 from the Elizabethtown Associates.  This group bought much of northern New Jersey from the Lenape in the late 17th century. Willcox built a grist and lumber mill across Green Brook.

In 1793, a regional government was formed. It encompassed the area from present-day Springfield Township, Summit, New Providence, and Berkeley Heights, and was called Springfield Township. Growth continued in the area, and by 1809, Springfield Township divided into Springfield Township and New Providence Township, which included present day Summit, New Providence, and Berkeley Heights.

In 1845, Willcox's heirs sold the mill to David Felt, a paper manufacturer from New York. Felt built a small village around the mill aptly named Feltville. It included homes for workers and their families, dormitories, orchards, a post office and a general store with a second floor church.

In 1860, Feltville was sold to sarsaparilla makers. Other manufacturing operations continued until Feltville went into bankruptcy in 1882. When residents moved away, the area became known as Deserted Village.  Village remains consist of seven houses, a store, the mill and a barn. Deserted Village is listed on the National Register of Historic Places and is undergoing restoration by the Union County Parks Department.  Restoration grants of almost $2 million were received from various state agencies. Deserted Village, in the Watchung Reservation, is open daily for unguided walking tours during daylight hours.

On March 23, 1869, Summit Township (now the City of Summit) seceded from New Providence Township. On March 14, 1899, the Borough of New Providence seceded from New Providence Township. Present day Berkeley Heights remained as New Providence Township. Many of the townships and regional areas in New Jersey were separating into small, locally governed communities at that time due to acts of the New Jersey Legislature that made it economically advantageous for the communities to do so.

Due to confusion between the adjacent municipalities of the Borough of New Providence and the Township of New Providence, the township conducted a referendum in 1952 and voted to change the name to Berkeley Heights Township. The origin of the township's name has never been fully established, but is believed to have been taken from an area of town that was referred to by this moniker, which itself was assumed to be derived from Lord John Berkeley, who was co-proprietor of New Jersey from 1664 to 1674.

Early life in Berkeley Heights is documented in the Littell-Lord Farmhouse Museum & Farmstead (31 Horseshoe Road in Berkeley Heights), an  museum surrounding two houses, one of which was built  and the other near the start of the 19th century.

Among the exhibits are a Victorian master bedroom and a Victorian children's room, furnished with period antiques. The children's room also has reproductions of antique toys, which visitors can play with. The museum, which is on the National Register of Historic Places, also includes an outbuilding that was used as a summer kitchen, a corn crib dating to the 19th century and a spring house built around a spring and used for refrigeration. The museum is open 2-4 p.m. on the third Sunday of each month from April through December, or by appointment.

The township owes its rural character to its late development. Until 1941, when the American Telephone and Telegraph Company built the AT&T Bell Laboratories research facility in the township, it was a sleepy farming and resort community.

Berkeley Heights is host to a traditional religious procession and feast carried out by members of Our Lady of Mt. Carmel Society. The feast is capped by one of the largest fireworks shows in the state. The Feast of Mt. Carmel has been a town tradition since 1909.

In 1958, part of a Nike missile battery (NY-73) was installed in Berkeley Heights.  The missiles were located in nearby Mountainside, while the radar station  was installed in Berkeley Heights. It remained in operation until 1963, and remnants of the site are located adjacent to Governor Livingston High School.

In 1960, the town’s seal was created via a contest in which local students could enter a design, and the best of these was officially named the seal, through an announcement on June 17, at Columbia Middle School.Patricia Jean Taylor created the winning design, which was chosen from a pool of 150 entries.

Free Acres
Another early Berkeley Heights community of note is the  Free Acres, established in 1910 by Bolton Hall, a New York entrepreneur and reformer who believed in the idea of Henry George, the economist, of single taxation, under which residents pay tax to the community, which, in turn, pays a lump sum to the municipality. Among the early residents of Free Acres were the actor James Cagney and his wife, Billie.

Residents of Free Acres pay tax to their association, which maintains its streets and swimming pool, approves architectural changes to homes and pays a lump sum in taxes to the municipality.

Geography
According to the United States Census Bureau, the township had a total area of 6.26 square miles (16.21 km2), including 6.22 square miles (16.11 km2) of land and 0.04 square miles (0.10 km2) of water (0.59%). Certain portions of Berkeley Heights are located in various flood zones.

The township is located partially on the crest of the Second Watchung Mountain and in the Passaic River Valley, aptly named as the Passaic River forms the township's northern border. The township is also located partially in the Raritan Valley region, in which the Green Brook (a tributary of the Raritan River) forms the township's eastern border near the Watchung Reservation. Berkeley Heights is located in northwestern Union County, at the confluence of Union, Morris, and Somerset Counties. Berkeley Heights is bordered by New Providence, Mountainside and Summit to the east, Scotch Plains to the southeast, Chatham to the north, Watchung to the south, and Warren Township and Long Hill Township to the west.Union County Municipal Profiles, Union County, New Jersey. Accessed March 19, 2020.

Unincorporated communities, localities and place names located partially or completely within the township include Benders Corners, Glenside Park, Stony Hill and Union Village.

Downtown
Downtown Berkeley Heights is located along Springfield Avenue, approximately between the intersections with Plainfield Avenue and Snyder Avenue. Downtown is home to more than 20 restaurants which join with the Downtown Beautification Committee to hold an annual Restaurant Week each September. In addition, a post office, the Municipal Building, police station, train station, Walgreens, CVS, Stop & Shop and other shops and services are located in this downtown section.

A brick walk with personalized bricks engraved with the names of many long-time Berkeley Heights residents runs from near the railroad station towards the planned Stratton House development, at the site of the former Kings. A memorial to the victims of the September 11 terrorist attacks adjoins a wooded area alongside Park Avenue, just southwest of downtown.

Certain portions of Berkeley Heights are located in flood zones.  Residential homes, as well as some commercial areas along the downtown Springfield Avenue area, are impacted by flooding.

Demographics

2020 census
The 2020 United States census counted 13,285 people, and 3,718 families in the township. The population density was 2,135.8 per square mile. There were 4,660 households (4,484 of which were occupied).

2010 census

The Census Bureau's 2006–2010 American Community Survey showed that (in 2010 inflation-adjusted dollars) median household income was $132,089 (with a margin of error of +/− $11,331) and the median family income was $150,105 (+/− $17,689). Males had a median income of $105,733 (+/− $10,158) versus $55,545 (+/− $11,985) for females. The per capita income for the township was $56,737 (+/− $5,135). About 0.8% of families and 1.4% of the population were below the poverty line, including 1.7% of those under age 18 and 0.7% of those age 65 or over.

2000 census
As of the 2000 United States census there were 13,407 people, 4,479 households, and 3,717 families residing in the township. The population density was 2,140.7 people per square mile (826.9/km2). There were 4,562 housing units at an average density of 728.4 per square mile (281.4/km2). The racial makeup of the township was 89.65% White, 1.11% African American, 0.08% Native American, 7.87% Asian, 0.61% from other races, and 0.68% from two or more races. Hispanic or Latino of any race were 3.68% of the population.DP-1: Profile of General Demographic Characteristics: 2000 - Census 2000 Summary File 1 (SF 1) 100-Percent Data for Berkeley Heights township, Union County, New Jersey, United States Census Bureau. Accessed May 5, 2013.

There were 4,479 households, out of which 41.5% had children under the age of 18 living with them, 74.1% were married couples living together, 6.9% had a female householder with no husband present, and 17.0% were non-families. 14.8% of all households were made up of individuals, and 7.5% had someone living alone who was 65 years of age or older. The average household size was 2.89 and the average family size was 3.21.

In the township the population was spread out, with 26.8% under the age of 18, 4.2% from 18 to 24, 27.8% from 25 to 44, 24.8% from 45 to 64, and 16.4% who were 65 years of age or older. The median age was 40 years. For every 100 females, there were 91.0 males. For every 100 females age 18 and over, there were 87.4 males.

The median income for a household in the township was $107,716, and the median income for a family was $118,862. Males had a median income of $83,175 versus $50,022 for females. The per capita income for the township was $43,981. About 1.5% of families and 2.1% of the population were below the poverty line, including 1.8% of those under age 18 and 3.1% of those age 65 or over.

Economy
Berkeley Heights is home to the Murray Hill Bell Labs headquarters of Nokia. The transistor, solar cell, laser, and AT&T Unix (precursor to Unix) were invented in this facility when it was part of AT&T.

Berkeley Heights is also home to L'Oréal USA's New Jersey headquarters.

In 2003, Summit Medical Group signed a lease to build its main campus on the site of the former D&B Corporation headquarters located on Diamond Hill Road. Summit Medical Group merged with CityMD in 2019 to form Summit Health, which has 2,500 health care providers in the New York City area and Oregon.

Arts and culture
Musical groups from Berkeley Heights include the alternative rock band, BEDlight for BlueEYES.

Parks and recreation

Located in Berkeley Heights are many municipal parks, including the largest one, Columbia Park (located along Plainfield Avenue). Columbia Park boasts tennis courts, two baseball fields, basketball courts, and a large children's play area. It is operated by the Recreation Commission. In addition to those located at each of the schools, athletic fields are located along Horseshoe Road (Sansone Field) and along Springfield Avenue (Passaic River Park).

There are three swimming clubs located in Berkeley Heights: the Berkeley Heights Community Pool (Locust Avenue), the Berkeley Swim Club (behind Columbia Park), and Berkeley Aquatic (off of Springfield Avenue).

The Watchung Reservation and Passaic River Parkway are in the township and maintained by Union County. The Watchung Reservation has hiking trails, horseback riding trails, a large lake (Lake Surprise), the deserted community of Feltville and picnic areas.

Government

Local government

In accordance with a ballot question that was passed in November 2005, Berkeley Heights switched from a Township Committee form to a Mayor-Council-Administrator form of government under the Faulkner Act. The township is one of three municipalities (of the 564) statewide that use this form of government. The switch took effect on January 1, 2007. In the elections in fall 2006, all seats were open. Under the new form of government, the mayor is directly elected to a four-year term. The Township Committee has been replaced with a Township Council comprised of six members elected to staggered, three-year terms. With all six Township Council seats open in 2006, two councilpersons were elected to one-year terms, after which those seats were open for three-year terms in 2007. Two other seats were open for two-year terms in 2006. The final two were open for three-year terms from the beginning. The responsibilities of the Township Administrator are unchanged.

, the Mayor of Berkeley Heights is Democrat Angie D. Devanney, whose term of office ends on December 31, 2022. Members of the Township Council are Council President Jeanne Kingsley (R, 2023), Council Vice President Manuel Couto (R, 2022), Gentiana Brahimaj (R, 2022), Paul Donnelly (R, 2024), John Foster (R, 2024) and Jeff Varnerin (R, 2023).2022 Municipal Data Sheet, Berkeley Heights Township. Accessed June 19, 2022.General Election November 2, 2021 Official Results, Union County, New Jersey, updated November 15, 2021. Accessed January 1, 2022.General Election November 5, 2019 Official Results, Union County, New Jersey, updated December 5, 2019. Accessed January 1, 2020.

The Council President serves as Acting Mayor in the Mayor's absence; the Council Vice President serves as Acting Mayor in the absence of both the Mayor and the Council President.

The Berkeley Heights Municipal Building is located at 29 Park Avenue. A new Municipal Complex is under construction at the same location.

Federal, state and county representation
Berkeley Heights is located in the 7th Congressional District and is part of New Jersey's 21st state legislative district.2019 New Jersey Citizen's Guide to Government, New Jersey League of Women Voters. Accessed October 30, 2019.

 

Union County is governed by a Board of County Commissioners, whose nine members are elected at-large to three-year terms of office on a staggered basis with three seats coming up for election each year, with an appointed County Manager overseeing the day-to-day operations of the county. At an annual reorganization meeting held in the beginning of January, the board selects a Chair and Vice Chair from among its members. , Union County's County Commissioners are 
Chair Rebecca Williams (D, Plainfield, term as commissioner and as chair ends December 31, 2022), 
Vice Chair Christopher Hudak (D, Linden, term as commissioner ends 2023; term as vice chair ends 2022),
James E. Baker Jr. (D, Rahway, 2024),
Angela R. Garretson (D, Hillside, 2023),
Sergio Granados (D, Elizabeth, 2022),
Bette Jane Kowalski (D, Cranford, 2022), 
Lourdes M. Leon (D, Elizabeth, 2023),
Alexander Mirabella (D, Fanwood, 2024) and 
Kimberly Palmieri-Mouded (D, Westfield, 2024).2022 County Data Sheet, Union County, New Jersey. Accessed May 20, 2022.
Constitutional officers elected on a countywide basis are
County Clerk Joanne Rajoppi (D, Union Township, 2025),Clerks, Constitutional Officers Association of New Jersey. Accessed May 20, 2022.
Sheriff Peter Corvelli (D, Kenilworth, 2023)Sheriffs, Constitutional Officers Association of New Jersey. Accessed May 20, 2022. and
Surrogate Susan Dinardo (acting).Surrogates, Constitutional Officers Association of New Jersey. Accessed May 20, 2022.
The County Manager is Edward Oatman.

 Politics 
As of May 18, 2017, there were a total of 9,558 registered voters in Berkeley Heights Township, of which 2,387 (25.0% vs. 45.2% countywide) were registered as Democrats, 3,368 (35.2% vs. 14.9%) were registered as Republicans and 3,780 (39.5% vs. 39.4%) were registered as Unaffiliated. There were 23 voters registered as Libertarians or Greens. Among the township's 2010 Census population, 68.8% (vs. 53.3% in Union County) were registered to vote, including 94.2% of those ages 18 and over (vs. 70.6% countywide).GCT-P7: Selected Age Groups: 2010 - State -- County Subdivision; 2010 Census Summary File 1 for New Jersey , United States Census Bureau. Accessed May 4, 2013.

In the 2016 presidential election, Democrat Hillary Clinton received 3,482 votes (48.23% vs. 65.94% countywide), ahead of Republican Donald Trump with 3,359 votes (46.53% vs. 30.47% countywide), and other candidates with 378 votes (5.1% vs  3.6% countywide) among the 7,325 ballots cast by the township's 9,775 voters, for a turnout of 74.9%

In the 2012 presidential election, Republican Mitt Romney received 3,897 votes (57.3% vs. 32.3% countywide), ahead of Democrat Barack Obama with 2,799 votes (41.1% vs. 66.0%) and other candidates with 76 votes (1.1% vs. 0.8%), among the 6,802 ballots cast by the township's 9,400 registered voters, for a turnout of 72.4% (vs. 68.8% in Union County).Number of Registered Voters and Ballots Cast November 6, 2012 General Election Results – Union County, New Jersey Department of State Division of Elections, March 15, 2013. Accessed May 5, 2013. In the 2008 presidential election, Republican John McCain received 4,011 votes (55.3% vs. 35.2% countywide), ahead of Democrat Barack Obama with 3,094 votes (42.7% vs. 63.1%) and other candidates with 93 votes (1.3% vs. 0.9%), among the 7,248 ballots cast by the township's 9,375 registered voters, for a turnout of 77.3% (vs. 74.7% in Union County). In the 2004 presidential election, Republican George W. Bush received 4,146 votes (57.1% vs. 40.3% countywide), ahead of Democrat John Kerry with 3,019 votes (41.6% vs. 58.3%) and other candidates with 60 votes (0.8% vs. 0.7%), among the 7,258 ballots cast by the township's 9,121 registered voters, for a turnout of 79.6% (vs. 72.3% in the whole county).

In the 2013 gubernatorial election, Republican Chris Christie received 72.2% of the vote (3,145 cast), ahead of Democrat Barbara Buono with 26.4% (1,150 votes), and other candidates with 1.4% (63 votes), among the 4,457 ballots cast by the township's 9,193 registered voters (99 ballots were spoiled), for a turnout of 48.5%. In the 2009 gubernatorial election, Republican Chris Christie received 3,136 votes (60.0% vs. 41.7% countywide), ahead of Democrat Jon Corzine with 1,589 votes (30.4% vs. 50.6%), Independent Chris Daggett with 409 votes (7.8% vs. 5.9%) and other candidates with 32 votes (0.6% vs. 0.8%), among the 5,223 ballots cast by the township's 9,201 registered voters, yielding a 56.8% turnout (vs. 46.5% in the county).

Education

Public schools

The Berkeley Heights Public Schools serves students in pre-kindergarten through twelfth grade. As of the 2020–21 school year, the district, comprised of six schools, had an enrollment of 2,499 students and 230.2 classroom teachers (on an FTE basis), for a student–teacher ratio of 10.9:1. Schools in the district (with 2020–21 enrollment data from the National Center for Education Statistics) are 
Mary Kay McMillin Early Childhood Center with 304 students in Pre-K–2 grade, 
William Woodruff Elementary School with 180 students in grades K–2, 
Thomas P. Hughes Elementary School with 264 students in grades 3–5, 
Mountain Park Elementary School with 243 students in grades 3–5, 
Columbia Middle School with 544 students in grades 6–8 and 
Governor Livingston High School with 960 students in grades 9–12.School Performance Reports for the Berkeley Heights School District, New Jersey Department of Education. Accessed July 18, 2022.

The district's high school serves public school students of Berkeley Heights, along with approximately 300 students from neighboring Borough of Mountainside who are educated at the high school as part of a sending/receiving relationship with the Mountainside School District that is covered by an agreement that runs through the end of 2021–2022 school year.Mustac, Frank. "Contract Signed to Continue Sending Mountainside Students to Governor Livingston High School", TAP into Mountainside, October 12, 2016. Accessed February 5, 2020. "With the Berkeley Heights Board of Education's recent approval of a renegotiated send/receive agreement, new terms are now in place by which the Mountainside School District will be sending its students in grades nine through 12 to Governor Livingston High School.... The new contract runs for five years from July 1, 2017 through June 30, 2022, with a renewal option for an additional five years... The business administrator explained that 30 percent of the Mountainside School District annual budget goes to paying the Berkeley Heights district for sending about 300 students who live in Mountainside to Governor Livingston High School." Governor Livingston provides programs for deaf, hard of hearing and cognitively-impaired students in the district and those who are enrolled from all over north-central New Jersey who attend on a tuition basis.

Governor Livingston was the 30th-ranked public high school in New Jersey out of 305 schools statewide in New Jersey Monthly magazine's September 2018 cover story on the state's "Top Public High Schools".

Private schools
There are four private pre-kindergarten schools in Berkeley Heights. The Westminster Nursery School is located at the corner of Plainfield Avenue and Mountain Avenue, the Union Village Nursery is located bordering Warren Township at the corner of Mountain Avenue and Hillcrest Road, the Diamond Hill Montessori is located along Diamond Hill Road opposite McMane Avenue and Primrose on Springfield Avenue.

FlexSchool, a private school for twice-exceptional and gifted fifth through twelfth graders, is the only private secondary school in Berkeley Heights.

Infrastructure

Transportation

Roads and highways

The most significant highway serving Berkeley Heights is Interstate 78, which runs from New York City to Pennsylvania. Other major roads in Berkeley Heights include Springfield Avenue, Mountain Avenue, Snyder Avenue, Plainfield Avenue, and Park Avenue. Springfield Avenue and Mountain Avenue run east–west, Snyder Avenue and Plainfield Avenue run north–south, while Park Avenue runs northeast–southwest. Each of these roads is heavily residential (except parts of Springfield Avenue) with only one travel lane in each direction.

Public transportation

NJ Transit provide service at the Berkeley Heights station serving Hoboken Terminal, Newark Broad Street Station, and Penn Station in Midtown Manhattan as part of the Gladstone Branch. Berkeley Heights is also in close proximity of the Summit station, which provides frequent commuter rail service to New York City.

NJ Transit offers local bus service on the 986 route. Lakeland Bus Lines also provides commuter bus service to the Port Authority Bus Terminal in Midtown Manhattan and a connection to Gladstone.

Freight rail transportation had been provided by Norfolk Southern via off-peak use of New Jersey Transit's Gladstone Branch line until a final run on November 7, 2008, after 126 years of service. The Berkeley Heights plant of Reheis Chemical located on Snyder Avenue was the last freight customer on the Gladstone Branch, receiving shipments of hydrochloric acid.

Healthcare
The Summit Medical Group, located on Mountain Avenue, is the main medical facility in Berkeley Heights.

Public library
Originally opened in 1949, Berkeley Heights Public Library closed its doors to the public at its 290 Plainfield Avenue location. It was moved to a temporary home at 110 Roosevelt Avenue, otherwise known as the Little Flower Church Rectory. The library is a member of the Infolink region of libraries, the Morris Union Federation (MUF) and the Middlesex Union Reciprocal Agreement Libraries (MURAL).

Police, fire, and emergency services

The Berkeley Heights Police Department is located at the Municipal Building, 29 Park Avenue. This is also the location of the Berkeley Heights Municipal Court.

The Berkeley Heights Volunteer Rescue Squad, founded in 1942, is located at the corner of Snyder Avenue and Locust Avenue. The closest trauma centers are Morristown Medical Center (in Morristown) and University Hospital in Newark. The closest hospital emergency room is Overlook Hospital in Summit.  The all-volunteer Rescue Squad provides emergency medical services to the township seven days per week. As of April 2019, the squad had 60 riding members including college and high school students of which 32 are certified EMTs.

The Berkeley Heights Fire Department is a volunteer fire department commanded by Chief James Hopkins. In addition to fire suppression, the department has members trained to respond to technical rescue and hazardous materials releases.

Notable people

People who were born in, residents of, or otherwise closely associated with Berkeley Heights include:

 Al Aronowitz (1928–2005), rock journalist who claimed that Bob Dylan wrote his famous "Mr. Tambourine Man" in Aronowitz's former Berkeley Heights home
 Steve Balboni (born 1957), former New York Yankee
 Dennis Boutsikaris (born 1952), actorMann, Virginia. "The Good Doctor Next Door", The Record, May 14, 1991. Accessed August 26, 2013. "There are several reasons why "Barney Miller" creator Danny Arnold wanted Dennis Boutsikaris for the lead in his new hospital sitcom Stat (9:30 tonight, Channel 7).... The actor, who was raised in Berkeley Heights and graduated from Hampshire College in Amherst, Mass., began his acting career with John Houseman's Acting Company."
 James Cagney (1899–1986), actor who resided in Free Acres
 David Cantor (born 1954), actor
 John Carlini, jazz guitarist
 Ronald Chen (born 1958), former Public Advocate of New Jersey, nominated to fill the position on January 5, 2006, by Governor of New Jersey Jon Corzine
 Christopher Durang (born 1949), playwright and actor
 Cathy Engelbert (born 1965), CEO of Deloitte, first female CEO of a major U.S. accounting firm
 Lauren Beth Gash (born 1960), lawyer and politician who served in the Illinois House of Representatives from 1993 to 2001
 Gina Genovese (born 1959), businesswoman and politician who has served as mayor of Long Hill Township
 Scott M. Gimple (born 1971), television and comic book writer
 Bolton Hall (1854–1938), founder of Free Acres
 MacKinlay Kantor (1904–1977), screenwriter and novelist, formerly resided in Free Acres
 Harry Kelly (1871–1953), anarchist
 Victor Kilian (1891–1979), actor
 P. F. Kluge (born 1942), novelist
 Mary Jo Kopechne (1940–1969), political aide who drowned off Chappaquiddick Island when Senator Ted Kennedy (D-Mass.) drove his car off a bridge on July 18, 1969 and failed to seek help
 John R. Pierce (1910–2002), communications engineer, scientist, and father of the communications satelliteKamin, Arthur Z. "State Becomes a Part of Celebrating Marconi's Achievements", The New York Times, October 23, 1994. Accessed July 24, 2013. "The recipient in 1979 was Dr. John R. Pierce, then of the California Institute of Technology who had been with AT&T Bell Laboratories at Murray Hill and at Holmdel. Dr. Pierce had lived in Berkeley Heights and now lives in Palo Alto, Calif."
 Jerry Ragonese (born 1986), professional lacrosse player for the Redwoods Lacrosse Club of the Premier Lacrosse League
 Juliette Reilly (born 1993), singer and YouTube personality
 Dennis Ritchie (1941–2011), creator of the C programming language and co-inventor of the UNIX operating system
 Bertha Runkle (1879–1958), novelist and playwright
 Peter Sagal (born 1965), playwright, screenwriter, actor, and host of the National Public Radio game show Wait Wait... Don't Tell Me! Jill Santoriello, playwright and author of the Broadway musical A Tale of Two Cities'', graduated from Governor Livingston High School
 Thorne Smith (1892–1934), author
 Zenon Snylyk (1923–2002), soccer player
 Katie Stout (born 1989), artist and designer whose work has been described as "naive pop."
 Betty Wilson (born 1932), politician who served in the New Jersey General Assembly from 1974 to 1976

References

External links

 
 

 
1809 establishments in New Jersey
Faulkner Act (mayor–council–administrator)
Populated places established in 1809
Townships in Union County, New Jersey